Aliabad Nazar Alivand (also Romanized as ʿĀlīābād Naẓar ʿAlīvand) is a village in Rumiani Rural District, Suri District, Rumeshkhan County, Lorestan Province, Iran. At the 2006 census, its population was 1,175, in 255 families.

References 

Populated places in Rumeshkhan County